Sir Richard Whittington (c. 1354–1423) was an English merchant and politician

Richard Whit(t)ington may also refer to:

Richard Whittington (academic), academic in the area of corporate strategy
Richard Whittington (diplomat), British diplomat
Richard Whittington (author) (1948–2011), British food writer
Richard Whitington (1912–1984), Australian cricketer
Richard Whittington, High Sheriff of Surrey (2016–17)

See also
Richard Whittington-Egan (1924–2016), Liverpool-born writer and criminologist